Massachusetts Senate's Worcester and Norfolk district in the United States is one of 40 legislative districts of the Massachusetts Senate. It covers 18.7% of Worcester County and 2.4% of Norfolk County population in 2010. Republican Ryan Fattman of Webster has represented the district since 2015.

Towns represented
The district includes the following localities:
 Bellingham
 Blackstone
 Douglas
 Dudley
 Hopedale
 Mendon
 Milford
 Millville
 Northbridge
 Oxford
 Southbridge
 Sutton
 Uxbridge
 Webster

Senators 
 James A. Kelly, circa 1975
 Louis Peter Bertonazzi, circa 1979-1993 
 Richard T. Moore, circa 2002 
 Ryan C. Fattman, 2015-current

Images
Portraits of legislators

See also
 List of Massachusetts Senate elections
 List of Massachusetts General Courts
 List of former districts of the Massachusetts Senate
 Other Worcester County districts of the Massachusetts Senate: 1st, 2nd; Hampshire, Franklin and Worcester; Middlesex and Worcester; Worcester, Hampden, Hampshire and Middlesex; Worcester and Middlesex
 Norfolk County districts of the Massachusetts House of Representatives: 1st, 2nd, 3rd, 4th, 5th, 6th, 7th, 8th, 9th, 10th, 11th, 12th, 13th, 14th, 15th
 Worcester County districts of the Massachusetts House of Representatives: 1st, 2nd, 3rd, 4th, 5th, 6th, 7th, 8th, 9th, 10th, 11th, 12th, 13th, 14th, 15th, 16th, 17th, 18th

References

External links
 Ballotpedia
  (State Senate district information based on U.S. Census Bureau's American Community Survey).
 

Senate 
Government in Worcester County, Massachusetts
Government of Norfolk County, Massachusetts
Massachusetts Senate